This is a list of Philadelphia Union Radio and Television broadcasters. The Philadelphia Union is an American professional soccer club based in Chester, Pennsylvania, which competes in Major League Soccer (MLS).

Television

2020s

2010s

Radio

2020s

2010s

References

Philadelphia Union
Major League Soccer on television
Lists of Major League Soccer broadcasters
Philadelphia Union broadcasters